Bad Medicine may refer to:

Film and television
 Bad Medicine (film), a 1985 film starring Steve Guttenberg
 "Bad Medicine" (Degrassi: The Next Generation), an episode of Degrassi: The Next Generation
 "Bad Medicine" (Homicide: Life on the Street), an episode of Homicide: Life on the Street

Literature
 Bad Medicine (novel), a 2000 novel by Jack Dann
 Bad Medicine (comics), a comic book by Nunzio DeFilippis and Christina Weir
 Bad Medicine, a 2003 nonfiction book by Christopher Wanjek
 Bad Medicine: Doctors Doing Harm Since Hippocrates, a 2006 nonfiction book by David Wootton (historian)
 "Bad Medicine", a short story by Robert Sheckley

Music
 "Bad Medicine" (song), a 1988 song by Bon Jovi

See also
 Bad Medicine Lake, in Minnesota, US